Sir John Rose, 1st Baronet  (2 August 1820 – 24 August 1888) was a Scots-Quebecer politician. He was a member of the Legislative Assembly of the Province of Canada and the Executive Council of the Province of Canada. After Confederation, he held the offices of Solicitor General of Canada, Minister of Public Works and Minister of Finance in the new federal government. In the United Kingdom, he held the offices of Receiver General of the Duchy of Cornwall and Privy Counsellor.

In 1872, he was created 1st Baronet Rose, of Montreal. His eldest son inherited the title and in 1909, his second son, Sir Charles Day Rose, was created 1st Baronet Rose of Hardwick House in his own right. His home from 1848, Rosemount, was in Montreal's Golden Square Mile. From 1872, he lived in England at Loseley Park.

Early life in Scotland
John Rose was born 2 August 1820, at Gask, near Turriff, Aberdeenshire. He was the son of William Rose (b. 1792), of Gask, and Elizabeth (d. 1822), daughter of Capt. James Fyfe. John's father, William, was a great-grandson of Hugh Rose, 16th Baron of Kilravock and Chief of Clan Rose. The estate of Gask had passed to John's father through his ancestor, Lt.-General Alexander Forbes (d. 1672), 10th Lord Forbes. John Rose was educated at Udny Academy and King's College, Aberdeen.

Career

In 1836, he immigrated to Huntingdon, Quebec, in what was then Lower Canada, where he was active in suppressing the Lower Canada Rebellion of 1837. He was admitted to the bar in 1842 and established a commercial practice in Montreal. From 1857 until 1867, he was a member of the Legislative Assembly of the Province of Canada, and he was a member of the Executive Council from 1858 until 1861.

He was Lower Canada's Solicitor General from 1857 to 1858 and from 1858 to 1859, and he also acted as various times as commissioner of public works and Receiver General. In 1864, the British government appointed him to the commission to settle claims under the Oregon Treaty with the United States.

Rose was elected to the House of Commons of Canada for the electoral district of Huntingdon, Quebec on 20 September 1867, and was later appointed Minister of Finance in the government of John A. Macdonald.  He resigned from Parliament on 29 September 1869, to return to private life with the banking firm of Morton, Rose and Co.

Rose was a delegate to the London Conference of 1866. In 1869, Rose moved to England to practise law and acted as an unofficial representative of the Canadian government.  His was one of the first missions of a partly diplomatic nature which Canada ever sent abroad.  He was sent partly because his was perceived as being "gentlemanly" enough for the world of London politics.  He worked for Canada's interests in trade and immigration, and lobbied for Canada's viewpoint on matter of Anglo-American relations.  In this function, he answered directly to the Prime Minister, John A. Macdonald, since it was an informal position and was therefore not under the purview of the Governor General, meaning that communications could be kept secret from the Imperial Government.  As well, Canada did not have a foreign affairs department at the time.  This unusual situation did lead to a tradition of direct executive involvement in foreign affairs in Canada which still exists.

He also sat on a number of Royal Commissions in Britain and became a baronet in 1872, and a member of the Imperial Privy Council in 1886. Following his passing in 1888, Sir John Rose was interred in Guildford, near the Loseley Park estate, which he had rented for some years.

Family

He was succeeded by his elder son Sir William Rose, 2nd Baronet.  His daughter Mary Rose married Major-General Sir Stanley de Astel Calvert Clarke, K.C.V.O., C.M.G.

His Clarke granddaughters, Mrs. Edith Mary Bibby and Mrs. Baird, were two of the noted beauties of the day, and their portraits by Fildes, R.A. (former) and by Shannon (latter) were exhibited at the Royal Academy, 1896. 

They were the daughters of  Mrs. Edith Mary Bibby married Frank Bibby, of Sansaw, near Shrewsbury, England, 1890, and the couple had two sons and two daughters.

Arms

References

External links
 

1820 births
1888 deaths
Alumni of the University of Aberdeen
Baronets in the Baronetage of the United Kingdom
Canada–United Kingdom relations
Canadian baronets
Canadian Ministers of Finance
Conservative Party of Canada (1867–1942) MPs
Canadian Knights Grand Cross of the Order of St Michael and St George
Members of the House of Commons of Canada from Quebec
Canadian members of the Privy Council of the United Kingdom
Members of the Legislative Assembly of the Province of Canada from Canada East
Members of the King's Privy Council for Canada
Lawyers in Quebec
Scottish emigrants to pre-Confederation Quebec
Persons of National Historic Significance (Canada)
Immigrants to Lower Canada
Clan Rose